Caroline Louise Snodgress (October 27, 1945 – April 1, 2004) was an American actress. She is best remembered for her role in the film Diary of a Mad Housewife (1970), for which she was nominated for an Academy Award and a BAFTA Award as well as winning two Golden Globes and two Laurel Awards.

Life and career
Born in Barrington, Illinois, Snodgress attended Maine Township High School East in Park Ridge, then Northern Illinois University before leaving to pursue acting. She trained for the stage at the Goodman School of Drama at the Art Institute of Chicago (now at DePaul University). After a number of minor TV appearances, her film debut was an uncredited appearance in Easy Rider in 1969 and a credited appearance in 1970 in Rabbit, Run. Her next film, Diary of a Mad Housewife (1970), earned her a nomination for Academy Award for Best Actress and two Golden Globe wins, as Best Actress in a Comedy or a Musical and New Star of the Year - Actress.

She left acting soon after to live with musician Neil Young and care for their son Zeke, who was born with mild cerebral palsy. She returned to acting in 1978 in The Fury.

According to Sylvester Stallone, the original actress in mind for the role of Adrian in Rocky was Snodgress. At the time, Harvey Keitel was tapped to play the brother due to the original idea being for each to be Irish as a contrast to the main character. However, Snodgress declined due to the money. Rocky director John G. Avildsen cast Snodgress in two of his later films: A Night in Heaven and 8 Seconds.

Neil Young's song "A Man Needs a Maid" was inspired by Snodgress, featuring the lyric "I fell in love with the actress / she was playing a part that I could understand."  The songs "Heart of Gold", "Harvest" and "Out on the Weekend" from Young's Harvest album and "Motion Pictures" from On the Beach are also inspired by their relationship. She and Young split in 1974, and his song "Already One" bookends their relationship. Later she and musician and film score composer Jack Nitzsche became lovers. Nitzsche had previously worked with Young on several albums. In 1979, Nitzsche was charged with threatening to kill her after he barged into her home and beat her with a handgun. He pled guilty to threatening her, was fined, and placed on three years' probation.

Her off-Broadway debut came as a replacement in 1981 with A Coupla White Chicks Sitting Around Talking. She also appeared in All the Way Home, Oh! What a Lovely War!, Caesar and Cleopatra, Tartuffe, The Balcony and The Boor (all at the Goodman Theatre, Chicago); and Curse of the Starving Class at the Tiffany Theatre (in Los Angeles). Other films include Murphy's Law, White Man's Burden, Pale Rider and Blue Sky. She also worked extensively in television.

Death
While waiting for a liver transplant, Snodgress was hospitalized in Los Angeles, where she died of heart failure on April 1, 2004, at age 58.

Filmography

Film

Television

References

External links

 

1945 births
2004 deaths
American film actresses
American television actresses
Best Musical or Comedy Actress Golden Globe (film) winners
New Star of the Year (Actress) Golden Globe winners
20th-century American actresses
21st-century American actresses
Actresses from Illinois
People from Barrington, Illinois